Tryphena Anderson (born 1933) was a Jamaican-British nurse, the first black health visitor in the United Kingdom.

Life
Tryphena Anderson was born in Jamaica, where she attended a Church of England school. In December 1952, a week after leaving school, she sailed for England, arriving in Liverpool on the RMS Franconia from New York.

Anderson recalled teachers having low expectations of her at school. As a black person in 1950s Britain, Anderson felt labelled as a "darkie" rather than truly accepted as a "person". She felt acute isolation:

Anderson nevertheless trained successfully as a nurse at Nottingham General Hospital and did psychiatric nursing at the Coppice Hospital. She did further postgraduate training in the early 1960s. In 1966 she qualified as a midwife, and in that year also became Britain's first black health visitor.

From 1988 until 2002 she owned and ran a nursing home.

References

1933 births
Living people
Migrants from British Jamaica to the United Kingdom
Jamaican nurses
British women nurses
British nurses
British midwives
Psychiatric nurses
Black British people in health professions